Kožlí is a municipality and village in Písek District in the South Bohemian Region of the Czech Republic. It has about 50 inhabitants.

Etymology
The name of the village was derived either from the personal name Kozel (meaning "Kozel's") or from goat farming (goat = koza in Czech).

Geography
It lies in the Benešov Uplands. It is situated on the western shore of the Orlík Reservoir, built on the Vltava River. There are also several small ponds, supplied by local brooks.

History

The first written mention of Kožlí is from 1396.

Sights
Northern part of the large park of the Orlík Castle extends into the territory of Kožlí. It includes the Schwarzenberg Tomb, built in the Neo-Gothic style in 1875–1877. It contains the remains of several members of the cadet branch of the House of Schwarzenberg, the most notable being Field Marshal Prince Karl Philipp of Schwarzenberg (1771–1820). The tomb is not open to the public.

References

External links

Villages in Písek District